Nahui may refer to:

Geography
 Nāhui, Peru, region of Cusco in Peru
 Nahui, Hainan, village in Tianya District, Sanya, Hainan
 Nahui, Guangxi, village in  Lingyun County, Baise, Guangxi

Other

 Nahui, is a species in the family Amaranthaceae

See also 
 Nahui Ollin - a concept in Aztec/Mexica cosmology

 Phyllophaga nahui - an insect of genus Phyllophaga